Jonathan Duane "Jake" Butt (born July 11, 1995) is a former American football tight end and current football analyst for the Big Ten Network. He played college football at Michigan. As a junior, he won the Ozzie Newsome Award. He was selected as a first-team All-American and was named Kwalick–Clark Tight End of the Year in both 2015 and 2016. He won the John Mackey Award given to the top tight end in college football and the Senior CLASS Award in 2016. He was drafted by the Denver Broncos in the fifth round of the 2017 NFL Draft.

In 2022, he began a new career in broadcasting working for the Big Ten Network with his inaugural game on September 10 between his alma mater Michigan versus Hawaii.

High school career
Butt was born in 1995 and raised in Pickerington, Ohio, attending Pickerington High School North. Butt caught 96 passes for 1,361 yards with 20 touchdowns and posted 142 tackles and 20.5 sacks during his high school career. He hauled in 68 receptions for 907 yards with 12 touchdowns as a senior and received AP Division I All-Ohio first-team recognition. Butt attended but did not participate in the Army All-America Game due to injury.

Recruiting 
Recruiting service Rivals.com rated Butt as a four-star recruit in the 2013 class. On February 19, 2013, Butt announced through Twitter his commitment to the Michigan Wolverines.

College career

Freshman season
Butt enrolled at the University of Michigan in 2013. He made his collegiate debut on August 31, 2013, and made his first career catch for an 8-yard gain in a victory over Central Michigan. On November 16, 2013, Butt caught his first career touchdown on an 11-yard pass from Devin Gardner, helping Michigan secure a win over Northwestern. On November 30, 2013, Butt caught a season-high five passes for 85 receiving yards and a touchdown as the Wolverines lost 42–41 to longtime rival Ohio State. He appeared in 13 games and started eight for the 2013 Michigan Wolverines football team. His playing time increased after Devin Funchess moved from tight end to wide receiver. He finished his first season at Michigan with 20 receptions for 235 yards and two touchdowns and was selected by ESPN.com as a member of the All-Big Ten Conference freshman team.

Sophomore season
The following season, Butt missed the first two games of the season while recuperating from a torn ACL. He made his season debut in Week 3 and caught three receptions for a season-high 59 receiving yards and scored a touchdown on a 29-yard pass from Devin Gardner in a 34–10 victory over Miami University. On November 29, 2014, Butt caught a season-high four passes for 35-yards and a touchdown during Michigan's 28–42 loss to #7 Ohio State. He appeared in nine games in 2014, five as a starter, and recorded 21 receptions for 211 receiving yards and two touchdowns. After Michigan finished the season 5–7, head coach Brady Hoke was relieved of his duties.

Junior season
During Michigan's season-opening 17–24 loss against Utah, Butt made a career-high eight receptions for 92-yards and caught an 8-yard touchdown pass from Jake Rudock. His eight catches was the most by a Michigan tight end since 1995. On November 7, 2015, he finished a 49–16 win over Rutgers with a career-high 102 receiving yards on four receptions. He finished the 2015 season with 51 catches for 654 receiving yards (12.8 yds/catch) and three touchdowns, while starting all 13 games. He was named the Kwalick–Clark Tight End of the Year, was named to the All-Big Ten offensive first-team, by both the coaches and media, and named a first-team All-American by Sports Illustrated and CBS Sports. He also won the Ozzie Newsome Award as the best tight end in college football.

Senior season

Butt opted to return for his senior season after considering entering the 2016 NFL Draft. The majority of NFL draft experts and analysts projected him to be a second round pick in 2016.  In August 2016, Butt and defensive end Chris Wormley were selected by a vote of their teammates as the team captains for the 2016 Michigan team. Through the first three games of the 2016 season, Butt led the Wolverines with 15 receptions, and he was second behind Amara Darboh with 192 receiving yards. During the 2016 season, Butt was the team's second-leading receiver with 43 receptions for 518 yards and four touchdowns, including 29 of those catches that netted a first down. He became both Michigan's all-time leading receiver in yards by a tight end (1,646 yards) and the program's record holder for career receptions by a tight end (136). Following the 2016 season, Butt was named to the All-Big Ten offensive first-team, by both the coaches and media, named a first-team All-American by the Walter Camp Football Foundation, and earned the Kwalick–Clark Tight End of the Year for the second straight season. He was also awarded the John Mackey Award, honoring the most outstanding tight end in college football.  Butt tore his ACL in the 2016 Orange Bowl game. Butt was named the 2016 Senior CLASS Award winner.

College statistics

Professional career

Butt was projected to be a second round pick in the 2017 NFL Draft by NFL draft experts and scouts before he tore his ACL in the Orange Bowl during the last collegiate game of his career. NFL draft analyst Todd McShay projected Butt to be selected within the first 50 picks in the 2017 NFL Draft prior to his injury. On January 11, 2017, Butt successfully underwent surgery to repair his torn ACL. Butt was unable to participate in drills at the NFL Scouting Combine and at Michigan's pro day. At the conclusion of the pre-draft process, Butt was projected to be a second or third round pick by NFL draft experts and scouts. He was ranked as the fifth best tight end in the draft by NFL draft analyst Mike Mayock and was ranked the sixth best tight end by DraftScout.com.

Denver Broncos

2017

The Denver Broncos selected Butt in the fifth round with the 145th overall pick in the 2017 NFL Draft. Butt was the eighth tight end drafted in 2017. Butt reportedly received a $543,000 payout due to a loss-of-value insurance claim he received due to his ACL injury. The loss-of-value insurance was a rider on top of a disability insurance that Butt bought prior to the draft that would pay out if he was not picked in the top half of the third round due to injury.

On May 11, 2017, the Denver Broncos signed Butt to a four-year, $2.70 million contract that included a signing bonus of $300,938.

He was placed on the reserve/non-football injury list on September 2, 2017, due to the torn ACL suffered his senior year. On November 6, 2017, the Denver Broncos placed Butt on injured reserve for the remainder of the 2017 NFL season.

2018
Butt recovered in time to participate physically in training camp in 2018. During training camp, he competed to be the starting tight end against Jeff Heuerman, Matt LaCosse, and Troy Fumagalli. Head coach Vance Joseph named Butt the secondary starting tight end to start the regular season, behind primary starting tight end Jeff Heuerman.

He made his professional regular season debut and first career start in the Denver Broncos' season opener against the Seattle Seahawks and caught two passes for 29 yards in their 27–24 victory. On September 27, 2018, Butt sustained a torn ACL during a non-contact drill during practice, which sidelined him for the remainder of the season.

2019
On September 2, 2019, Butt was placed on injured reserve due to complications with his previous ACL injury.

2020
Butt played in five games before being placed on injured reserve with a hamstring injury on November 3, 2020. He was activated on December 31, 2020. After the season, Butt became a free agent due to his contract expiring.

Chicago Bears
On June 18, 2021, Butt signed a contract with the Chicago Bears. On July 28, 2021, Butt announced his retirement from the NFL.

References

External links

Denver Broncos bio
Michigan Wolverines bio

1995 births
Living people
All-American college football players
American football tight ends
Chicago Bears players
Denver Broncos players
Michigan Wolverines football players
People from Pickerington, Ohio
Players of American football from Ohio